State Route 101 (SR 101) is a primary state highway in the U.S. state of Virginia.  Known as Hershberger Road, the state highway runs  from SR 117 east to U.S. Route 11 (US 11) within Roanoke.  SR 101 is a major east–west arterial on the north side of Roanoke, where it connects Interstate 581 (I-581) and US 220 with Roanoke–Blacksburg Regional Airport.

Route description

SR 101 begins at an intersection with SR 117 (Peters Creek Road) in the northwestern part of the city of Roanoke.  The state highway heads east as a two-lane undivided road between the Westview Terrace and Washington Heights neighborhoods.  SR 101 expands to a six-lane divided highway just west of its intersection with Cove Road, which heads south as SR 116.  The state highway curves northeast through a commercial area where it has a cloverleaf interchange with I-581 and US 220.  SR 101 passes along the southern edge of the Roanoke Regional Airport property and has a partial cloverleaf interchange with the intersecting boulevard, which heads south as Valley View Boulevard toward the Valley View Mall and north as Aviation Drive to provide access to the airport.  The interchange includes a flyover ramp from eastbound SR 101 to northbound Aviation Drive.  The state highway continues east through another commercial area to its eastern terminus at US 11 (Williamson Road).  Hershberger Road continues east as a two-lane undivided city street to the eastern city limits of Roanoke, where it continues into Roanoke County as SR 625 to SR 115 (Plantation Road).

Major intersections

References

External links

Virginia Highways Project: VA 101

101
State Route 101